The  was an infantry division of the Imperial Japanese Army. It was formed 12 July 1944 in Dongning as a triangular division. The nucleus for the formation was the 9th Independent Garrison Group. The division was initially assigned to the Third Army.

Action
Initially the 111th Division was tasked with a garrison duty around Dongning.

In April 1945, it was reassigned to the Fifty-Eighth Army and in May 1945 moved to the Jejudo island. Small parts were left behind and were incorporated into the 124th Division. On Jejudo, the unit spent time until the surrender of Japan preparing a fortifications without seeing combat.

The division was repatriated to Sasebo 10–12 November 1945 and dissolved shortly afterwards.

See also
 List of Japanese Infantry Divisions

Notes and Sources
This article incorporates material from Japanese Wikipedia page 第111師団 (日本軍), accessed 27 June 2016
 Madej, W. Victor, Japanese Armed Forces Order of Battle, 1937–1945 [2 vols], Allentown, PA: 1981.

References

Japanese World War II divisions
Infantry divisions of Japan
Military units and formations established in 1944
Military units and formations disestablished in 1945
1944 establishments in Japan
1945 disestablishments in Japan